The 1995 San Francisco mayoral election was held on November 7, 1995, with a runoff election held on December 12, 1995. Former Speaker of the California State Assembly Willie Brown defeated incumbent mayor Frank Jordan in a runoff election to become the 41st Mayor of San Francisco.

Results

References

External links 
 San Francisco Department of Elections

1995 California elections
1995
San Francisco
1995 in San Francisco